Petra Růčková (born 8 February 1989) is a Czech handball player for DHK Baník Most and the Czech national team.

References

External links

1989 births
Living people
Czech female handball players
People from Rožnov pod Radhoštěm
Sportspeople from the Zlín Region